is a branch line of the Hanshin Electric Railway Main Line in Nishinomiya, Hyōgo Prefecture, Japan with no through service.  The line is single-tracked, but is double-tracked at all stations except Suzaki Station.  The route follows the western edge of the Mukogawa River from the Hanshin Main Line to the river's former mouth at Mukogawadanchimae Station. Since 6 June 2020, the line has been operated by a fleet of 5500 series two-car sets, which have replaced the fleet of 7861 series sets that were used on the line previously.

Stations

Gallery

References 

Mukogawa Line
Standard gauge railways in Japan
Rail transport in Hyōgo Prefecture
Railway lines opened in 1943